The Bonnanaro culture is a protohistoric culture that flourished in Sardinia during the 2nd millennium BC (1800–1600 BC), considered to be the first stage of the Nuragic civilization. It takes its name from the comune of Bonnanaro in the province of Sassari where in 1889 the eponymous site was discovered.

Chronology

The Bonnanaro culture is divided chronologically into two main phases:

Origin
According to Giovanni Lilliu the people who produced this culture probably originated in Central Europe and the Polada culture area. From a material culture point of view, the Bonnanaro culture shows influences of the preceding pan-European Bell Beaker culture, the post-Beaker (epicampaniforme) Polada culture from northern Italy, the Remedello culture, Rinaldone culture and El Argar culture.

M.Perra (1997) theorizes a season of conflict between the Chalcolithic natives and the groups of Beaker heritage which caused a general involution, typical of this historical phase.

Description

Bonnanaro sites, mostly burials, are scattered throughout Sardinian territory, with a higher concentration in the mining regions of Nurra and Sulcis-Iglesiente and in the Campidano. Ceramics were smooth and linear without decorations and characterized by handles. Numbers of metal objects increased and the first swords of arsenical bronze appeared.

Only four settlements of this culture are known: Su Campu Lontanu Florinas, Sa Turricula  Muros, Costa Tana Bonarcado and Abiti Teti. The houses had a base of masonry while the roof was made of wood and branches.

It is still uncertain whether the first "protonuraghi" or "pseudonuraghi" were built at this time, or in the successive Sub-Bonnanaro culture (or Bonnanaro B) of the Middle Bronze Age (1600–1330 BC), although C14 on organic finds from the Protonuraghe Bruncu Madugui (Gesturi) suggest that it was built sometime around 1820 BC. The Proto-Nuraghi were megalithic edifices which are considered the precursors of the classic Nuraghi. They are horizontal buildings characterized by a long corridor with rooms and cells.

The Bonnanaro grave typologies include the domus de janas, caves, cists and allée couvertes.

Physical anthropology

About 200 human skeletons of the period show that the Bonnanaro population (phase A1) was composed mainly of dolicochepalic individuals (67%) with a minority of brachycephalics (33%), the latter concentrated in the north-western portion of the island. The average height was 1.62 m for men and 1.59 m for women. The Bonnanaro population suffered from osteoporosis, hyperostosis, anemia, caries and tumors. Cranial trepannation was practiced.

Paleogenetics
A 2022 study by Marjusha Chintalapati et al. found evidences of moderate steppe-related ancestry (although minoritarian compared to  Western Hunter-Gatherer and Early European Farmer ancestries) in some of the Early Bronze Age Sardinians from the North-West (e.g. necropolis of Su Crucifissu Mannu) and Central part of the Island (Table J).

Notes

Bibliography

See also
Pre-Nuragic Sardinia
Beaker culture in Sardinia
Nuragic civilization
History of Sardinia

Beaker culture
Archaeological cultures of Southern Europe
Archaeological cultures in Sardinia